Bearskin Lake Air Service LP, operating as Bearskin Airlines, is a regional airline based in Thunder Bay, Ontario, Canada. It is a division of Perimeter Aviation and operates services in northern Ontario and Manitoba. Its main base is at Thunder Bay International Airport (YQT), with a hub at Greater Sudbury Airport (YSB).

History 

The airline was established in 1963 by bush pilot Otto John Hegland and started operations in July 1963 from its base at Big Trout Lake, home of the Kitchenuhmaykoosib Inninuwug First Nation. However, the airline was named after Bearskin Lake, home of the Bearskin Lake First Nation,  where Hegland had a general store). It started out by providing only charter services to the remote First Nations reserves in northern Ontario, using bush planes equipped with floats in the summer and skis in the winter. In 1977, it began its first regular scheduled flights between Big Trout Lake and Sioux Lookout.

From then on, other scheduled flights were progressively added, first to Thunder Bay, followed by Kenora and Winnipeg. This was also the period when the Government of Ontario began constructing new airfields that would make the northern communities accessible year-round. Therefore, in the late 1970s to the early 1980s, Bearskin made the transition of bush planes to wheeled commuter planes.

Following the collapse of NorOntair in 1996, Bearskin picked up over two thirds of that carrier's routes, thereby adding scheduled service to all the major northern Ontario cities. Three years later, it expanded operations to destinations in northern Manitoba. In 2003, it sold its routes and assets servicing northern First Nations communities to Wasaya Airways. This marked as a break with its bush flying background to focus on becoming a regional carrier.

It was owned by Harvey Friesen (President), Cliff Friesen (Executive Vice-President), Karl Friesen (Vice President of Operations), Rick Baratta (Vice President of Finance) and Brad Martin (Director of Operations), but in 2010 it was sold to Exchange Income Corporation (EIC) for $32 million. EIC also owns Calm Air, Perimeter Aviation, PAL Airlines, Keewatin Air, and several other non-airline companies. Bearskin has 240 employees.

As of April 1, 2014, all service at Region of Waterloo Airport (YKF) and Ottawa Airport (YOW) was cancelled, affecting seven routes and significantly decreased the flight operations. The company indicated that a softening mining sector and high tech sectors (such as BlackBerry) were to blame for cutting the routes. Additional factors included the introduction of new competitors (such as Porter Airlines). The company indicated that it is refocusing on northwestern and northeastern routes in Northern Ontario.

Bearskin is a major provider of flights for Hope Air, a charity that organizes free non-emergency medical flights for people in financial need, particularly from remote communities.

Destinations 

Bearskin Airlines operates services to the following Canadian domestic scheduled destinations:

Fleet 
As per the Bearskin Airlines site the only aircraft they operate are Fairchild Swearingen Metroliners. As of February 2023, Perimeter Aviation has 22 of the aircraft available:

Previously operated
Bearskin Airlines has flown the following aircraft in the past:
 Beechcraft Model 18
 Beechcraft Model 99
 Beechcraft King Air 100
 Cessna 180 Skywagon
 Cessna 185 Skywagon
 de Havilland DHC-2 Beaver
 de Havilland DHC-3 Otter
 Noorduyn Norseman
 Pilatus PC-12
 Piper Aztec
 Piper Navajo and Navajo Chieftain
 Saab 340

Affinity programs
The airline offers Aeroplan rewards points, both to collect and to redeem.

Accidents and incidents
May 1, 1995: Flight 362, a Swearingen Metroliner, collided with an Air Sandy Piper Navajo Chieftain while on approach to Sioux Lookout Airport, destroying both aircraft and killing all persons on both aircraft, a total of eight dead.
December 4, 1997: Flight 310, a Beechcraft 99 hit the runway at Webequie Airport when it descended too quickly. No injuries were reported but the aircraft was written off.
November 10, 2013: A Swearingen Metroliner crashed on approach into Red Lake Airport in Ontario after a flight from Sioux Lookout Airport, killing five of seven people aboard. The crash occurred south of the airfield where the aircraft struck trees and a power line before being destroyed by impact and fire. This slowed the aircraft and caused it to stall. This led Honeywell, the engine manufacturer, to issue a change to inspection procedures for fuel nozzles.

References

External links 

Official website

Regional airlines of Ontario
Air Transport Association of Canada
Airlines established in 1963
Sioux Lookout
1963 establishments in Ontario
Companies based in Thunder Bay